Rachel Sarah Parris (born 27 May 1984) is an English comedian, musician, actress and presenter. She hosts the satirical news show Late Night Mash (formerly The Mash Report).

Early life
Parris attended Loughborough High School. She holds an upper second-class (2:1) Music BA from St Hilda's College, Oxford and a master's degree from the Royal Central School of Speech and Drama for acting.

Career
Parris's stand-up comedy has been featured on Live at the Apollo, and she has performed solo shows at the Edinburgh Fringe, including It's Fun To Pretend, which was expanded into a UK tour for 2018/19.

She presented the fourth series of the Game of Thrones spin-off show Thronecast, and A Girl's Guide to TV, a comic guide to how women can get ahead in television, which first aired on BBC2 on 10 June 2018.

As an actor, Parris was cast in the BBC show Murder in Successville, and also appeared on The IT Crowd, Plebs and Count Arthur Strong.

She has been a panellist on QI, I'm Sorry, I Haven't a Clue, Would I Lie to You? and Mock the Week. In 2017 she was a guest on Richard Herring's Leicester Square Theatre Podcast, in 2018 she was a guest on Pappy's Flatshare Slamdown podcast, and in 2019 Richard Osman's House of Games.

Parris is a regular guest co-host on the podcast The Guilty Feminist.

Parris was in one episode of Apple TV+'s Trying.

Parris wrote a book published in 2022, Advice from Strangers: Everything I Know from People I Don't Know.

Improvisational comedy

Parris began improv comedy in 2007  with The Oxford Imps and musical comedy in 2010. As part of the Austentatious improv group, she has performed in Edinburgh, London, and on a UK tour, beginning a run at the Fortune Theatre in London from 18 February 2019.

In 2014 Austentatious won the Chortle Award for Best Character, Improv or Sketch Act, and DVDs of their live shows were released by Gofasterstripe in 2015 and 2018.

Awards
In 2019, she was nominated for the BAFTA Television Award for Best Entertainment Performance for her work on The Mash Report.

In 2019, Parris won the Chortle Award for Best Music and Variety Act.

In 2018, Parris was named Female First's Comedian of the Year, beating Tiffany Haddish, Amy Schumer and Ellen DeGeneres to the prize.

She won runner-up placing in the annual Musical Comedy Awards competition in 2012, and has since headlined shows of theirs each year.

Personal life
Parris lives in South West London and is married to fellow comedian Marcus Brigstocke. The couple have a son, Billy.

Television and radio credits
The Hit List, BBC One, 2022
Question Team, Dave, 2021
Late Night Mash, Dave, 2021–present
Trying, Apple TV+, 2020
Richard Osman's House of Games, BBC 2, 2019
I'm Sorry I Haven't a Clue, BBC Radio 4, 2019 – present
QI, BBC Two, 2019
Would I Lie To You?, BBC One, 2019
Hypothetical, Dave, 2019
Private Passions, BBC Radio 3, 2019
Live at the Apollo, BBC One, 2018
Plebs, ITV 2, 2018
QI, BBC Two, 2018
Mock the Week, BBC Two, 2018
A Girl's Guide to TV, BBC Two, 2018
The Mash Report, BBC Two, 2017–2020
Austentatious, BBC Radio 4, 2017
The Now Show, BBC Radio 4, 2016
Murder In Successville, BBC Three, 2015-2016
Thronecast, Sky Atlantic, 2014
The IT Crowd, Channel 4, 2013
Count Arthur Strong, BBC One, 2013
Eggheads, BBC Two, 2009

References

External links 

1984 births
21st-century English actresses
21st-century English comedians
Alumni of the Royal Central School of Speech and Drama
Alumni of St Hilda's College, Oxford
English television actresses
English women comedians
Living people
People from Leicester
Television personalities from Leicestershire